Cymothoe herminia, the Herminia glider, is a butterfly in the family Nymphalidae. It is found in Sierra Leone, Liberia, Ivory Coast, Ghana, Nigeria, Cameroon, Equatorial Guinea, the Republic of the Congo, the Central African Republic, the Democratic Republic of the Congo, Uganda, Kenya, Tanzania and Zambia. The habitat consists of lowland to submontane forests.

Adults are attracted to fermented fruit.

The larvae feed on Dovyalis, Rawsonia and Dasylepis species.

Subspecies
Cymothoe herminia herminia (eastern Nigeria, Cameroon, Equatorial Guinea, Congo, Central African Republic, Democratic Republic of the Congo: Ituri Forest)
Cymothoe herminia gongoa Fox, 1965 (Sierra Leone, Liberia, Ivory Coast, Ghana)
Cymothoe herminia johnstoni (Butler, 1902) (Uganda, western Kenya, western Tanzania)
Cymothoe herminia katshokwe Overlaet, 1940 (southern Democratic Republic of the Congo, Zambia)

Gallery

References

Butterflies described in 1887
Cymothoe (butterfly)
Butterflies of Africa
Taxa named by Henley Grose-Smith